The Chapel Hill Rear Range Light is a lighthouse located off of Middletown Township in Monmouth County, New Jersey, United States, which functioned as the rear light of the now-discontinued Chapel Hill Range.

History
This light was one of three identical lighthouses built along the New York harbor approaches in the 1850s (the others being the New Dorp Light and the Point Comfort Light). It worked in concert with the Conover Beacon to mark the Chapel Hill Channel, which runs north-south between the main Ambrose Channel and the secondary channel into Raritan Bay. The light took its name from a Baptist church built in 1809.

The old house was auctioned off in 1959 and sold to a New York businessman who intended it as a present for his amateur astronomer son. The building has since had several owners, who put an addition on the east end, added dormers along the roof line, and added various decorative touches.

See also
Conover Beacon

References

Transportation buildings and structures in Monmouth County, New Jersey
Lighthouses completed in 1856
Lighthouses in New Jersey
Middletown Township, New Jersey